Hardenhuish Park is a cricket ground in Chippenham, Wiltshire.  The ground is located behind the football ground used by Chippenham Town F.C.  Hardenhuish Park hosted a cricket match in June 1900 between teams representing the Trowbridge and Chippenham Police divisions, when the home team recorded a resounding victory. In 1902 Wiltshire played Dorset in the Minor Counties Championship.  The ground was used on-and-off by Wiltshire during the 20th century, hosting 47 Minor Counties Championship matches.  Two MCCA Knockout Trophy matches were also held there in 2002 and 2003.

Wiltshire have also played a number of List A matches at the ground, starting with playing against Hampshire in the 1964 Gillette Cup, which was Wiltshire's first ever List A match.  Five further List A matches were held on the ground, four of which had a combined Minor Counties team as the home side, and the last of which saw Wiltshire play the Derbyshire Cricket Board in the 2001 Cheltenham & Gloucester Trophy.

References

External links
Hardenhuish Park at ESPNcricinfo
Hardenhuish Park at CricketArchive

Cricket grounds in Wiltshire
Chippenham
Sports venues completed in 1902